John R. Pringle is an American scientist. He is a professor at Stanford University. He received an AB in Mathematics from Harvard University and a PhD in Biology also from Harvard University (1970).

He is the 2013 recipient of the E.B. Wilson Medal, the American Society for Cell Biology's highest honor for science.

He married Beverly S. Mitchell (September 5, 1971) and has two children, Robert and Elizabeth both biologists.

References

Harvard College alumni
Living people
American geneticists
Stanford University faculty
Harvard Graduate School of Arts and Sciences alumni
Year of birth missing (living people)